Li Peiwu (born November 1961) is a Chinese agronomist who is a researcher at the Oil Crops Research Institute (OCRI) of the Chinese Academy of Agricultural Sciences (CAAS).

Biography
Li was born in Chengwu County, Shandong, in November 1961. After graduating from Nanjing Agricultural University in 1986, he was offered a faculty position at the Oil Crops Research Institute (OCRI) of the Chinese Academy of Agricultural Sciences (CAAS).

Honours and awards
 November 22, 2019 Member of the Chinese Academy of Engineering (CAE)

References

External links
 

1961 births
Living people
People from Chengwu County
Engineers from Shandong
Nanjing Agricultural University alumni
Members of the Chinese Academy of Engineering